Dr. Demento 25th Anniversary Collection is a release by radio disc jockey Dr. Demento to celebrate 25 years since the beginning of his radio career and novelty song show. It covers many of the novelty and comedy songs from the 1950s to the early  1990s, such as Shaving Cream by Benny Bell, to the then recent release of Smells Like Nirvana by "Weird Al" Yankovic, whose popularity was boosted by Demento. It is also a sequel to the previous album, Dr. Demento 20th Anniversary Collection.

Track listing

Disc one

Disc two

References

Novelty albums
1996 compilation albums
Comedy rock compilation albums